The ATP Challenger Open (currently known as STRABAG Challenger Open 2016 for sponsorship reasons) is a professional tennis tournament played on outdoor red clay courts. It is currently part of the Association of Tennis Professionals (ATP) Challenger Tour. It is held annually at the TC EMPIRE in Trnava, Slovakia, since 2007.

Past finals

Singles

Doubles

External links
ITF Search

ATP Challenger Tour
Clay court tennis tournaments
Tennis tournaments in Slovakia
 
Sport in Trnava
Annual sporting events in Slovakia
2007 establishments in Slovakia
Recurring sporting events established in 2007